Minister for Local Government or Minister of Local Government may refer to:

 Minister for Local Government (Ghana)
 Minister for Local Government (New South Wales)
 Minister for Local Government (Victoria)
 Minister for Local Government (Western Australia)
 Minister for Local Government and Financial Markets, Sweden
 Minister for Local Government and Government Business, Wales
 Minister for Local Government and Planning, Scotland
 Minister for Local Government, Territories and Roads, Australia
 Ministry of Local Government and Rural Development (Sierra Leone)
 Minister for the Environment, Community and Local Government, Ireland
 Minister of Housing and Local Government (Malaysia)
 Minister of Local Government (Manitoba)
 Minister of Local Government (New Zealand)
 Minister of Local Government and Regional Development, Norway
 Minister of Health and Local Government (1944-65), Northern Ireland
 Minister for Local Government (United Kingdom)